The 1999–2000 Danish Cup was the 46th installment of the Danish Cup, the highest football competition in Denmark.

Final

References

1999-2000
1999–2000 domestic association football cups
Cup